Shahrokhi may refer to

Shahrokhi (surname)
Kahnuj-e Shahrokhi, a village in Iran
Nehzat-e Olya, or Shahrokhi, a village in Iran